Bodway is a hamlet in Cornwall, England, UK. According to the Post Office, the 2011 census population was included in the civil parish of St Ive.

References

Hamlets in Cornwall